Juan Carlos García may refer to:

 Juan Carlos García (Mexican footballer) (born 1985), Mexican football defender
 Juan Carlos García (Honduran footballer) (1988–2018), Honduran football left back
 Juan Carlos García (actor) (born 1971), Venezuelan actor and model
 Juan Carlos García (equestrian) (born 1967), Colombian equestrian, who later represented Italy
 Juan Carlos García Pérez de Arce (born 1971), Chilean politician and minister
 Juan Carlos García Granda, Cuban politician and acting Minister of Tourism

See also 
 Juan Garcia (disambiguation)